The Rufus P. Jordan House, also known as Mar Vista, is an historic house located at the north end of Longboat Key in Manatee County, Florida. Built by Rufus P. Jordon for himself out of rusticated cement blocks fabricated on site, it remained a single family residence until 1942, when then owners Wayne Sipe and his wife, relatives of Rufus Jordan and his wife, divided it into apartments. In the 1980s it became the Mar Vista Restaurant.

On August 12, 2005, it was added to the National Register of Historic Places.

References

External links

 Weekly List Of Actions Taken On Properties: 8/7/05 Through 8/12/05 at National Register of Historic Places

National Register of Historic Places in Manatee County, Florida
Houses on the National Register of Historic Places in Florida
Houses in Manatee County, Florida